Wrocanka  is a village in the administrative district of Gmina Miejsce Piastowe, within Krosno County, Subcarpathian Voivodeship, in south-eastern Poland.

The village has a population of 1,200.

References

Wrocanka